Julie Jensen  (born 25 February 1996) is a Danish handball player for Silkeborg-Voel KFUM and the Danish national team.

She was selected as part of the Danish 35-player squad for the 2020 European Women's Handball Championship.

She competed in the winning team of the Danish Handball Cup 2019.

References

1996 births
Living people
Danish female handball players
Sportspeople from Aalborg